Genas is a commune in the Rhône department in eastern France. Since 2008, Daniel Valéro has been the mayor of Genas. He was re-elected in the 2020 municipal elections.

Geography 
It is located approximately 14 km (9 mi) east-southeast of Lyon. The town includes the hamlets of Azieu and Vurey.

History 
Formerly part of the Isère department, Genas was attached to the Rhône department in 1967.

Population

Transportation
The town is served by Rhône public transport services.

Twin towns
Genas is twinned with Ronshausen in Germany.

See also
Communes of the Rhône department

References

Communes of Rhône (department)